Catherine Tramell is a fictional character and the main antagonist of the film Basic Instinct (1992) and its sequel Basic Instinct 2 (2006). Catherine Tramell, created by writer Joe Eszterhas, is played by Sharon Stone in both films. In Basic Instinct, directed by Paul Verhoeven, Catherine Tramell is a serial killer and love interest of detective Nick Curran; Basic Instinct 2 pairs her with the similarly troubled British psychologist Michael Glass.

One European critic defined Catherine Tramell as "a mix between the classic femme fatale and the new psycho killers, one of the most evil characters ever created, on Hannibal Lecter's level." She was nominated to be a member of the American Film Institute's "Best Villains" list. Entertainment Weekly named Tramell one of the 100 Greatest Characters of the Last 20 Years.

Appearances

Basic Instinct
Basic Instinct establishes Tramell as a beautiful, wealthy heiress and successful crime novelist who is connected to the violent stabbing death of a washed-up rock musician, Johnny Boz, who was found in his bed tied to the bed posts with a white silk scarf. She is subsequently investigated by San Francisco homicide detectives Nick Curran (Michael Douglas) and Gus Moran (George Dzundza), who learn that Boz died in exactly the same manner as a character in Tramell's most recent novel. Tramell shows little emotion upon hearing of Boz's death, and under questioning by the police, behaves provocatively; in the film's most famous scene, Tramell recrosses her legs to show that she is not wearing underwear beneath her short skirt.

Curran looks into Tramell's troubled history and links her to the deaths of her wealthy parents (who died in a boating accident), her counselor at UC Berkeley (who was also killed with an ice pick in an unsolved homicide), and her former fiancé, a famous boxer, who died in the ring. She also has a habit of befriending imprisoned murderers such as her girlfriend Roxy, who killed her brothers as a teenager, and Hazel Dobkins, an elderly woman who killed her husband and children for no apparent reason. However, when he confronts Tramell, she taunts him with knowledge of his drug addiction and his killing of two tourists on assignment while high on cocaine. Thinking that Tramell received the confidential information from an adversarial internal affairs investigator, Marty Nilsen, a violent Curran gets himself suspended and falls into a drunken stupor. After Nilsen is found dead, he becomes the prime suspect. Curran, increasingly seduced by Tramell, becomes sexually involved with her; she tells him that he will be the basis of the character in her next novel.

A torrid affair between Tramell and Curran begins with the air of a cat-and-mouse game. Curran shows up at a club and witnesses her sniffing cocaine in a bathroom stall. Later, they have aggressive sex at Tramell's apartment.

Roxy, jealous of Nick's relationship with Catherine, unsuccessfully attempts to kill Curran and dies in a car crash. Tramell's apparent grief over Roxy's death leads Curran to doubt her guilt. Curran then learns that as a college student, Tramell had a lesbian encounter with Beth Garner, a police psychologist with whom he previously had an affair. Upon finding the manuscript to Tramell's latest novel, and reading the final pages where the fictional detective finds his partner's dead body, Curran realizes that Moran is in danger. He is too late to stop Moran's apparent murder by Garner, whom he shoots when he thinks she is retrieving a weapon. Evidence collected in Garner's apartment points to her as the killer of Boz, Nilsen, Moran, and her own husband. She is ultimately branded as the killer.

Curran is left confused and dejected, knowing from the manuscript that Tramell was involved in Moran's murder and somehow set up Garner, but tells no one. When he tries to confront her after returning to his apartment, the two end up making love. During a session of pillow talk where they discuss their future, Tramell reaches for something under the bed before abruptly resuming sex. The camera pans below the bed to show Tramell's weapon of choice, an ice pick, implying that she could kill Curran and wants to do it.

Basic Instinct 2
Fourteen years after the events of the first movie, Tramell speeds through London in a sports car with Kevin Franks, an English football player. After taking Franks' hand to masturbate herself and reach orgasm, Tramell crashes the car into the River Thames.  She attempts to save her partner, but she says in the subsequent scene, "When it came down to it, I guess my life was more important to me than his." When Scotland Yard finds evidence of her culpability in the death, Tramell is made to attend therapy sessions with a court-appointed psychologist, Dr. Michael Glass (David Morrissey). At her trial, Glass testifies that Tramell is a narcissist who suffers from a pathological "risk addiction", showing no regard for right or wrong. However, Glass' testimony is deemed insufficient, and Tramell goes free.

Tramell begins playing mind games with Glass, who finds himself becoming both frustrated and increasingly intrigued by her. Eventually, he succumbs to temptation and begins an illicit affair with Tramell. However, following the murder of his ex-wife's partner—a journalist planning to write a negative story about Glass—he suspects that she is trying to frame him for the killing. As more people close to Glass turn up dead, his obsession with Tramell grows to the point where it threatens his career and livelihood. In the meantime, Glass conducts a survey for Detective Superintendent Roy Washburn (David Thewlis), who has taken the Tramell case and is now investigating the murders, and discovers aggravating elements for his earlier professional life. Eventually, Glass himself can no longer tell right from wrong and now he suspects that everything was designed by the corrupt officer  for the latter to nail the writer.

During Glass' confrontation with Tramell, she reveals that her latest novel is based on the present situation, featuring characters based on herself, Glass, and the victims. Tramell gives to Glass a draft of her new book, which suggests that her next victim is his colleague, Dr. Gardosh (Charlotte Rampling). However, this turns out to be a ruse to trick Glass into having a violent confrontation with Tramell and Gardosh, and subsequently he shoots Detective Washburn. Glass is committed to a mental hospital, where Tramell reveals the whole plot of her latest book The Analyst, which gained a better ending thanks to him, and flashbacks are shown of Glass committing all the murders. The novelist tells him to come back soon because she misses him, and leaves with a wicked smirk on her face. Glass, still sitting in his wheelchair, takes the book in his hands and an enigmatic spasmodic movement is erased on his lips.

Other appearances
Catherine Tramell, again played by Sharon Stone, has a cameo in the 1993 film Last Action Hero starring Arnold Schwarzenegger.

Tramell's victims in Basic Instinct
Prior to and during Basic Instinct, the following people met a violent death, killed by Catherine:

A potential victim of hers is Nick Curran, who is almost stabbed during the film's final scenes. The ending is ambiguous: either Catherine has retired from her criminal career for good, or she has only postponed killing Nick. Incidentally, Nick Curran has disappeared by the second movie. During an interview in Spain, Sharon Stone commented that "poor Nick is dead," implying with a swift stabbing motion that an ice pick was indeed used.

A conversation in Basic Instinct 2 reveals Nick's fate more explicitly. Michael Glass tells Tramell he has spoken to Lieutenant Phil Walker, who appeared in the first film, and she summarily dismisses this news with the remark, "Paranoid Phil. Now there's a blast from the past". According to Glass, "He said you murdered a Johnny Boz and two detectives in San Francisco", to which she answers, "I was never even charged". Glass finally says, "Grand jury said that Nick Curran's girlfriend did it". Since only one police detective is killed onscreen in the first movie (Nilsen is merely an Internal Affairs officer), the implication is that Curran was the second detective to be killed.

Legacy 

Catherine Tramell is considered to be one of Stone's most iconic roles, with the actor mentioning how difficult it was to play a serial killer in her memories book, dedicating several chapters to the character, accepting Catherine Tramell to be her most famous and relevant character. Tramell was nominated for the American Film Institute's list of the "Best Villains", and was named one of the greatest characters by Entertainment Weekly in 2010.

During the trial of the murder of Jun Lin, it was then determined that Magnotta's "Tramell" alias drew on elements from the 1990s erotic thriller Basic Instinct, using not only the name of the movie's main character, but also borrowing from her crime when he killed 33-year-old Jun Lin, according to the prosecution at his murder trial.

References

Female characters in film
Fictional bisexual females
Fictional characters from San Francisco
Film characters introduced in 1992
Fictional cocaine users
Fictional LGBT characters in film
Fictional matricides
Fictional patricides
Fictional psychologists
Fictional serial killers
Fictional writers
Female film villains
Thriller film characters
LGBT villains
Sharon Stone